The 1941 election for Mayor of Los Angeles took place on April 1, 1941, with a run-off election on May 6, 1941. Incumbent Fletcher Bowron was re-elected in the runoff election, defeating councilmember Stephen W. Cunningham.

Municipal elections in California, including Mayor of Los Angeles, are officially nonpartisan; candidates' party affiliations do not appear on the ballot.

Election 
After being elected in the 1938 recall, Bowron was now seeking a second term in office, with it being his first full term. He was challenged by city councilmember Stephen W. Cunningham, U.S. Representative Charles Kramer, and former Mayors John C. Porter and Frank L. Shaw. Thomas F. Ford, another U.S. Representative, had previously filed to run before withdrawing. In the primary, Bowron and Cunningham advanced to the general election, with Bowron taking most of the votes.

In the runoff election, American attorney Greg Bautzer urged the election of Cunningham against Bowron. Bowron won the runoff with a majority of the vote.

Results

Primary election

General election

References and footnotes

External links
 Office of the City Clerk, City of Los Angeles

1941
Los Angeles
1941 California elections
1941 in Los Angeles